Ironchrist is an American crossover/thrash metal band founded in 1986 from the demise of the punk rock band Spastic Rats. Along with label mates Indestroy, Ironchrist was one of the biggest metal bands of the late 80s to early 90s in the mid-Atlantic region and considered a pioneer of the punk/metal crossover movement. After touring and recording for several years, Ironchrist disbanded in 1993 and members moved on to pursue other musical and artistic interests. In 2012, Divebomb/Tribunal Records Records re-released Ironchrist's entire discography in a deluxe edition, available as both CD and MP3 download.

Biography 
Ironchrist's foundation was forged in the early 80s punk scene in Washington DC. Known as the Spastic Rats, members Tristan Lentz and Ned Westrick, along with drummer Kenny Hill opened for punk icons such as Black Flag and Scream before deciding to part ways with Hill and disband. Soon after, Westrick and Treude met and began jamming with Lentz. Deciding to blend their roots with Treude's jazz background and the then current thrash metal movement they decided to change their name from Spastic Rats to Metal God, before landing on Ironchrist.

The original lineup, consisting of Tristan Lentz (guitar, vocals), Ned Westrick (bass/vocals), and Scott Treude (drums), recorded one demo they employed to secure a recording contract with New Renaissance Records. Taking the best three tracks from the demo, the threesome went to LSP Studios, owned and operated by Lentz's twin brother Les, to record their first EP. Before the EP was released in 1988, the band wrote most of what would become their first, and only, full-length album. Soon after, Mike Bullock (vocals) was introduced to Lentz at a party and joined the band the following day. They re-entered LSP Studios a short month later in November 1988 to record Getting The Most Out Of Your Extinction.

After turning the master tapes over to New Renaissance Records, the band set about touring in support of the album that was to be released in early 1989. However, the label shelved the tapes. The band continued to tour and build a cult following all over the eastern United States, all the while awaiting the release of their record.

In late 1989, New Renaissance announced a deal to open a new label, Colossal Records in partnership with Restless Records and assured the four members of Ironchrist their record would be one of the new labels first releases. By the time the album finally arrived on store shelves, well over two years after they recorded it, Ironchrist had temporarily disbanded. Vocalist Mike Bullock then joined label mates Indestroy who were having similar troubles with New Renaissance/Colossal Records.

After Getting The Most Out Of Your Extinction was finally released in 1990, the band reformed with guitarist Rod Reddish replacing Tristan Lentz, who had moved on to explore a hard rock/fusion style he had experimented with while in Ironchrist. The band completed a tour of the Mid-Atlantic and Southern US States over the course of the next year before Bullock left to resume playing with Indestroy in 1991. The band continued without Bullock, with Westrick taking over the vocal duties for a short time before ultimately disbanding.

In 2012 Divebomb/Tribunal Records released a re-mastered, deluxe edition of Getting The Most Out Of Your Extinction that included the first self-titled EP and remaining tracks from the band's first demo.

Successes 
Ironchrist spent the majority of 1990–1991 in the College Music Top 100, thanks in great part to several college DJs that were familiar with the band through their connection to the metal tape trading movement popular in the 1980s.

Discography

Studio albums 
 Self Titled (1988)
 Getting The Most Out of Your Extinction (1990)
 Getting The Most Out of Your Extinction – Deluxe Edition (2012)

Demos 
 Ironchrist (1987)

External links 
 Official website
 Divebomb Records Page
 Encyclopedia Metallum – Metal Archive Page
 Official Facebook page
 Hard Rock Haven review of Getting The Most Out Of Your Extinction
 Blog Critics: Music Review

American thrash metal musical groups
Heavy metal musical groups from Maryland
Musical groups established in 1986
American speed metal musical groups
Musical groups reestablished in 2008
Musical quartets
1986 establishments in the United States
Restless Records artists